Midge Lake is the largest among numerous freshwater lakes on the ice-free Byers Peninsula, Livingston Island in the South Shetland Islands, Antarctica. The feature is arcuate in shape, extending 575 m in southwest-northeast direction and 125 m wide, surmounted by Chester Cone on the southeast, and draining through a 2 km stream north-northeastwards into Baba Tonka Cove.

The lake's name derives from the chironomid midge Belgica antarctica, a rare and localized insect in the South Shetlands, the imagos of which are found beneath the surrounding rock debris in summer.

Location

Maps
 Península Byers, Isla Livingston. Mapa topográfico a escala 1:25000. Madrid: Servicio Geográfico del Ejército, 1992.
 L. Ivanov et al. Antarctica: Livingston Island and Greenwich Island, South Shetland Islands. Scale 1:100000 topographic map. Sofia: Antarctic Place-names Commission of Bulgaria, 2005.
 L. Ivanov. Antarctica: Livingston Island and Greenwich, Robert, Snow and Smith Islands. Scale 1:120000 topographic map. Troyan: Manfred Wörner Foundation, 2009. 
 L. Ivanov. Antarctica: Livingston Island and Smith Island. Scale 1:100000 topographic map. Manfred Wörner Foundation, 2017.

References
 Midge Lake. SCAR Composite Antarctic Gazetteer

Bodies of water of Livingston Island

Lakes of the South Shetland Islands